Malcolm Clive Spence (4 September 1937 in Johannesburg – 30 December 2010) was a South African athlete who competed mainly in the 400 metres.  All sixteen of Malcolm Spence's great, great grandparents emigrated to South Africa from Kent, England.

He ran for South Africa in the 1956 Summer Olympics held in Melbourne, Australia, finishing sixth in the 400 meters. In the 1958 Commonwealth Games he won silver in the individual and gold in the relay. He also represented his country in the 400 metres in the 1960 Summer Olympics held in Rome, Italy, where he won the bronze medal.  Curiously, there were two people named Malcolm Spence running the 400 meters distance at the 1960 Olympics, both getting a bronze medal.  Malcolm Spence from Jamaica was unable to get out of the semi-final round in the Open race.  But the Jamaican, who shortened his name to Mal Spence, led off his British West Indian relay team which finished a second ahead of the South African relay team anchored by this Malcolm Spence.

References

External links
 
 

1937 births
2010 deaths
Sportspeople from Johannesburg
South African people of English descent
South African male sprinters
Olympic bronze medalists for South Africa
Athletes (track and field) at the 1956 Summer Olympics
Athletes (track and field) at the 1960 Summer Olympics
Olympic athletes of South Africa
Athletes (track and field) at the 1958 British Empire and Commonwealth Games
Commonwealth Games gold medallists for South Africa
Commonwealth Games silver medallists for South Africa
Commonwealth Games medallists in athletics
Medalists at the 1960 Summer Olympics
Olympic bronze medalists in athletics (track and field)
Medallists at the 1958 British Empire and Commonwealth Games